Edward John "E. J." McGuire (June 26, 1952 – April 7, 2011) was an American ice hockey coach who served as the director of the NHL Central Scouting Services. He earned his PhD in sports psychology from the University of Waterloo in 1990.

Coaching career
A native of Buffalo, New York, McGuire was an assistant coach in the National Hockey League with the Philadelphia Flyers from 1984 to 1988 and the Chicago Blackhawks from 1988 to 1991.  His first head coaching job was in 1991–92 with the Maine Mariners of the AHL, which the team ended out of the playoffs with 23–47–10 record.  After being let go from that position, he returned to the NHL, this time with the Ottawa Senators.

After three years in Ottawa, he took his second head coaching position, this time in Canadian major juniors with the Ontario Hockey League's Guelph Storm.  With the help of future NHLers, Herberts Vasiļjevs and Dan Cloutier, he led the Storm to the Hamilton Spectator Trophy, as the team with the highest point total in the regular season.  Guelph made the playoffs the next year, falling in the semifinals of the OHL Playoffs.

McGuire moved back into professional hockey in 1997, signing on as the head coach with the AHL's Hartford Wolf Pack.  After two playoff appearances in two years, he once again stepped back from coaching to focus on scouting.  His last coaching position was as an assistant with the Philadelphia Flyers in 2001–02.  Afterwards, he began to do more work with the NHL Central Scouting Services.

McGuire served as head coach at SUNY Brockport (ECAC) from 1977 to 1982.

NHL Central scouting
McGuire was the director of NHL Central Scouting from 2005 to 2011.  He usually gave his input on the rankings and was a desired interview by NHL media around the rankings time and the draft.

Awards
Coach of Hamilton Spectator Trophy–winning Guelph Storm in 1995–96

Death
On April 7, 2011, McGuire died  in Toronto from cancer (leiomyosarcoma), aged 58.

Coaching statistics
Through 2001–02 season

See also
E.J. McGuire Award of Excellence
 List of University of Waterloo people

References

External links

1952 births
2011 deaths
Deaths from cancer in Ontario
American ice hockey coaches
Chicago Blackhawks coaches
Ottawa Senators coaches
Sportspeople from Buffalo, New York
Philadelphia Flyers coaches
University of Waterloo alumni
Deaths from leiomyosarcoma